Cayetano Cornet Pamies (born August 22, 1963) is a retired 400 metres runner from Spain. He was born in Reus, Catalonia.

He won the European Indoor Championships in 1986 as well as two World Indoor Championships bronze medals and one European Indoor Championships bronze medal.

International competitions

1Did not start in the quarterfinals

External links

1963 births
Living people
Spanish male sprinters
Athletes from Catalonia
Athletes (track and field) at the 1988 Summer Olympics
Athletes (track and field) at the 1992 Summer Olympics
Olympic athletes of Spain
World Athletics Indoor Championships medalists
Athletes (track and field) at the 1987 Mediterranean Games
Mediterranean Games silver medalists for Spain
Mediterranean Games medalists in athletics